Davudabad Rural District is a rural district (dehestan) in the Central District of Arak County, Markazi Province, Iran. At the 2006 census, its population was 3,039, in 865 families. The rural district has 4 villages.

References 

Rural Districts of Markazi Province
Arak County